The 2017 Mount Albert by-election was a New Zealand by-election held in the electorate on 25 February 2017 during the 51st New Zealand Parliament. The seat was vacated following the resignation of David Shearer, a former Leader of the New Zealand Labour Party.

The by-election was avoided by all right and centre-right parties, and turnout was low. The electorate was won by Labour Party list MP Jacinda Ardern by a large margin. Another Labour member, Raymond Huo, filled Ardern's list seat.

Background
The Mount Albert electorate includes the communities of Point Chevalier, Owairaka, Mount Albert, part of Sandringham, Kingsland, and is home to Eden Park. As a result of boundary changes in 2014, the electorate gained the suburbs of Grey Lynn and Westmere, but lost Waterview and the areas alongside Rosebank Road to the Kelston electorate. Mount Albert (known as Owairaka from 1996 to 1999) was held between 1981 and 2009 by Helen Clark, ending with her retirement from parliament.

Although just 23.0% of the Mount Albert electorate is over 50 (the fifth-lowest proportion among general electorates), the share of those aged 30–49 (34.1%) is the highest in New Zealand. The largest sector of those working is in the professions, science and technical industries (16.7%); a further 5.4% work in the media and communications sectors, the largest share of any general electorate. Compared to the rest of New Zealand in 2013, Mount Albert had low levels of those who were married (33.5%, 5th lowest), owned their own home (36.4%, 7th lowest), and who declared a Christian religious affiliation (38.5%, 3rd lowest).

The winning candidate in the 2014 election, David Shearer (Labour), captured a majority (58.7%) of the 35,716 valid electorate votes cast for candidates in the Mount Albert electorate. The National Party captured a plurality (39.1%) of the party votes in Mount Albert, up 2.4 percentage points on its party vote share in 2011. The Labour Party captured 29.4% of the party votes, while the Green Party was third with 21.8% of the party votes. No other party gained more than 5% of the party votes. Turnout (total votes cast as a proportion of enrolled electors) in 2014 was 80.4%.

Resignation of David Shearer
On 8 December 2016, David Shearer, a former leader of Labour, announced that he was going to head the United Nations Mission in South Sudan. He officially resigned from the House of Representatives on 31 December 2016.

Candidates

Nominations for the by-election closed on 1 February 2017 with thirteen candidates nominated. The New Zealand National Party announced it would not stand a candidate in the by-election. The Prime Minister, Bill English, cited that approach for multiple reasons; Mount Albert was a safe seat for Labour and that Jacinda Ardern, who is highly likely to get Labour's nomination, would be "pretty difficult to beat". Other than The Opportunities Party, no right or centrist parties stood, with ACT New Zealand, United Future, and New Zealand First all avoiding the by-election.

Voting
Voting from overseas started on 8 February. Advance voting started on 13 February 2017.

Overall voter turnout in the by-election was low. After the counting of special votes, the Electoral Commission recorded a turnout of only 30% of enrolled voters in Mount Albert. This compares to a much higher turnout of 79.4% in the electorate at the 2014 general election.

Results

Labour list MP Jacinda Ardern won the electorate and kept the seat for the Labour Party. As Ardern moved from a list seat to an electorate seat, the Labour Party replaced her list seat with another person from their party list. Labour party leader, Andrew Little, announced this would be Raymond Huo. Huo was the third-highest unelected person on Labour's party list, but both Maryan Street and Moana Mackey announced they would decline the chance to return to Parliament.

See also 
 2016 Mount Roskill by-election, on 3 December 2016

References

2017 elections in New Zealand
Mount Albert 2017
February 2017 events in New Zealand
Jacinda Ardern
Politics of the Auckland Region